The president of the Senate of Barbados is the presiding officer of Senate of Barbados. This position was preceded by the president of the Legislative Council of Barbados. The President of the Senate is to perform presidential duties in the absence of the President.

Below is a list of office-holders:

Notes

Sources 
  Official website of the Parliament of Barbados
  Presidents of the Senate

See also
 List of Members of the Senate of Barbados
 List of current presidents of assembly

Barbados, Senate
Senate
Lists